Nathan Hart (born 4 March 1993) is an Australian track cyclist. He qualified for the Tokyo 2020 Olympics and rode in the Men's Individual Sprint. Unfortunately, Hart, together with his compatriot Matthew Richardson, exited the tournament in the first round.

Early years 
Hart's father, Braham, was a track cyclist father, and he was an inspiration to him. Hart was identified by the ACT Academy of Sport talent search program and appeared at his first senior national championships in 2012. With his father willing him on, Hart made his world cup debut in late 2013, where he finished third in the Team Sprint.

Achievements 
Hart competed at the 2016 Olympic Games where he finished 4th in the Team Sprint with Matthew Glaetzer and Patrick Constable. He also competed at the 2014 Commonwealth Games where he finished 3rd in the Team Sprint with Shane Perkins and Matthew Glaetzer. He represented Australia at the 2015 UCI Track Cycling World Championships and the 2016 UCI Track Cycling World Championships

At the 2018 Commonwealth Games, Hart finished 3rd in the team sprint event alongside Jacob Schmid and Patrick Constable.

References

External links

1993 births
Living people
Australian male cyclists
Sportspeople from Canberra
Cyclists from the Australian Capital Territory
Commonwealth Games bronze medallists for Australia
Cyclists at the 2014 Commonwealth Games
Cyclists at the 2016 Summer Olympics
Cyclists at the 2020 Summer Olympics
Olympic cyclists of Australia
Commonwealth Games medallists in cycling
ACT Academy of Sport alumni
Medallists at the 2014 Commonwealth Games